Brenda Ethel Speaight married name Brenda Singer (1906-1989) was an English international badminton player.

Badminton career
Brenda born in 1906  was the runner-up in three consecutive women's doubles at the 1932 All England Badminton Championships, 1933 All England Badminton Championships and 1934 All England Badminton Championships. She represented Middlesex and England.

References

English female badminton players
1906 births
1989 deaths